Arun Kumar Upreti is an Indian politician. He was elected to the Sikkim Legislative Assembly from Arithang in the 2019 Sikkim Legislative Assembly election as a member of the Sikkim Krantikari Morcha. He has served his tenure as Minister of Urban & Housing development, Food & Civil supplies and Consumer affairs from 2019 to 2022 in P. S. Golay Cabinet.At present, he is the Speaker of Sikkim State Legislative Assembly.

References

1968 births
Living people
Sikkim Krantikari Morcha politicians
People from Gangtok
Sikkim MLAs 2019–2024